Blood of the Dragon, also known as The Desperate Chase, is a 1971 Hong Kong/Taiwanese wuxia film starring Jimmy Wang.

Cast
Jimmy Wang as White Dragon / Lung Tai
Ted Henning - the English voice of Lung Tai
Lisa Chiao Chiao as Miss Yan
Yau Lung as Ni Chiu
Yeung Yeung as Ma Tang
Miao Tian as Sing Pa-tou
Yee Yuen as General Tai
Got Siu-bo as minor official
Kong Ching-ha as Mrs Yang
Su Chen-ping as Kang Fu's offsider
O Yau-man as Gold Leopard
Au Lap-bo as waiter
Wong Fei-lung as Kang Fu (credited as Lung Fei)
Lui Jun as Mr Yang
Yuen Sam as Ma Tang's lieutenant
Cheung Yee-kwai as thug
Wong Wing-sang as thug
Yu Chung-chiu
Tin Yau as Ma Chin
Gam Man-hei
Man Git
Hau Pak-wai
Wong Kwok-fai as soldier
Lau Yau-bun as soldier

External links

1971 films
Hong Kong martial arts films
Wuxia films
1970s Hong Kong films